UN numbers from UN1701 to UN1800 as assigned by the United Nations Committee of Experts on the Transport of Dangerous Goods are as follows:


UN 1701 to UN 1800 

n.o.s. = not otherwise specified meaning a collective entry to which substances, mixtures, solutions or articles may be assigned if a) they are not mentioned by name in 3.2 Dangerous Goods List AND b) they exhibit chemical, physical and/or dangerous properties corresponding to the Class, classification code, packing group and the name and description of the n.o.s. entry

See also 
Lists of UN numbers

References

External links
ADR Dangerous Goods, cited on 7 May 2015.
UN Dangerous Goods List from 2015, cited on 7 May 2015.
UN Dangerous Goods List from 2013, cited on 7 May 2015.

Lists of UN numbers